PGP-RTB (abbreviation for ) was a major state-owned record label and chain record store in the former SFR Yugoslavia, based in Belgrade, Socialist Republic of Serbia. After the breakup of Yugoslavia, in 1993, the company changed its name to PGP-RTS (Produkcija Gramofonskih Ploča Radio-Televizije Srbije).

History
PGP-RTB was established in 1959, as the music production branch of the national Radio-Television Belgrade.

After the breakup of Yugoslavia, in 1993, the company changed its name to PGP-RTS (Produkcija Gramofonskih Ploča Radio-Televizije Srbije), which is the music production branch of the national Radio Television of Serbia.

Artists
PGP-RTB is notable for signing numerous eminent former Yugoslav pop and rock, as well as folk acts. Some of the artists that have been signed to PGP-RTB include:

Alisa
Amajlija
Silvana Armenulić
Arsen Dedić
Atomsko Sklonište
Bajaga i Instruktori
Đorđe Balašević
Banana
Bastion
Bebi Dol
Bele Vrane
Bel Tempo
Beograd
Bezobrazno Zeleno
Bulevar
Buldožer
Ceca
Crni Biseri
Crveni Koralji
Dejan Cukić
Čista Proza
Nikola Čuturilo
Zdravko Čolić
Dado Topić
DAG
Delfini (Split band)
Disciplina Kičme
Divlji Anđeli
Doktor Spira i Ljudska Bića
Drugi Način
Džentlmeni
Ekatarina Velika
Elipse
Galija
Generacija 5
Gordi
Griva
Grupa I
Heroina
Heroji
Igra Staklenih Perli
Merlin
Miroslav Ilić
Indexi
Jakarta
Jugosloveni
Jutro
Karizma
Kerber
Tereza Kesovija
Korni Grupa
Miha Kralj
La Strada
Laboratorija Zvuka
Laki Pingvini
Leb i Sol
Lepa Brena
Lutajuća Srca
Mama Rock
Oliver Mandić
Đorđe Marjanović
Srđan Marjanović
Slađana Milošević
Toni Montano
Oktobar 1864
Osmi Putnik
Osvajači
Parni Valjak
Partibrejkers
Piloti
Pomaranča
Pop Mašina
Porodična Manufaktura Crnog Hleba
Poslednja Igra Leptira
Propaganda
Predmestje
Dušan Prelević
Radomir Mihajlović Točak
Rambo Amadeus
Rani Mraz
Riblja Čorba
Roze Poze
San
September
Siluete
Slomljena Stakla
Smak
Boba Stefanović
Suncokret
S Vremena Na Vreme
Šaban Šaulić
Miladin Šobić
Tako
Time
Tunel
Neda Ukraden
U Škripcu
Vampiri
Van Gogh
Viktorija
Vlada i Bajka
Warriors
YU Grupa
Zana
Zdravo
Zebra
Zlatko Pejaković
Zlatni Prsti
Vesna Zmijanac
Zona B

PGP-RTB has also released some albums by eminent classical musicians at that time, such as Milenko Stefanović and Ernest Ačkun.

Like other former Yugoslav labels, PGP-RTB also had a licence to release foreign titles for the Yugoslav market including notable international popular music stars such as: ABBA, Louis Armstrong, Joan Baez, Bee Gees, Blood, Sweat & Tears, Bon Jovi, James Brown, John Coltrane, Cream, Def Leppard, Dire Straits, Bryan Ferry, Jimi Hendrix, INXS, Joan Jett and The Blackhearts, Elton John, Kiss, Amanda Lear, The Moody Blues, Billy Ocean, The Platters, The Police, Rainbow, Siouxsie and The Banshees, Status Quo, Rod Stewart, Sting, The Style Council, Tangerine Dream, The Who, and others.

Competition
Other major labels in the former Socialist Federal Republic of Yugoslavia were: Jugodisk from Belgrade, Jugoton and Suzy from Zagreb, Diskoton from Sarajevo, ZKP RTLJ from Ljubljana, Diskos from Aleksandrovac, and others.

See also
List of record labels

References

External links
PGP-RTS official page

Serbian record labels
Yugoslav record labels
Serbian rock music
Yugoslav rock music
Record labels established in 1958
State-owned record labels
1958 establishments in Yugoslavia
Radio Television of Serbia